Peter Urban (16 July 1941 in Berlin – 9 December 2013) was a German writer and translator.

Biography
He studied History, German studies and Slavic studies at the Julius-Maximilians-Universität Würzburg and the University of Belgrade.

He became famous for his translations of Russian authors, including Isaak Babel, Anton Chekhov, Daniel Charms, Leonid Dobychin, Ivan Goncharov, Nikolai Gogol, Alexander Pushkin, and Ivan Turgenev. He also translated from Serbian, Serbo-Croatian, Slovene and Czech.

He was granted several important translation prizes, such as the Übersetzerpreis der Akademie für Sprache und Dichtung, the Preis der Stadt Münster für Europäische Poesie, the Johann-Heinrich-Voß-Preis für Übersetzung and the Helmut-M.-Braem-Übersetzerpreis.

A street in Belgrade is named after him.

References

External links
 Würdigung Peter Urbans in der Zeitschrift "Via regia"
 

1941 births
2013 deaths
Writers from Berlin
Translators from Czech
Translators to German
Translators from Russian
Translators from Serbian
Translators from Slovene
University of Belgrade alumni
University of Würzburg alumni
20th-century German translators
20th-century German male writers
German male non-fiction writers